Yashasvi Bhupendra Kumar Jaiswal (born 28 December 2001) is an Indian professional cricketer who plays for Mumbai in domestic cricket and Rajasthan Royals in the Indian Premier League (IPL). He is the youngest cricketer in the world to score a List A double century. He was the leading run-scorer of India U-19 team and player of the tournament at the 2020 Under-19 World Cup in South Africa.

Early life
Jaiswal was born on 28 December 2001 in Suriyawan, Bhadohi, Uttar Pradesh, as the fourth of six children, to Bhupendra Jaiswal, owner of a small hardware store, and Kanchan Jaiswal, a housewife. At the age of ten, he moved to Dadar, Mumbai, to receive cricket training at Azad Maidan. As Dadar was far away from the Maidan, he relocated to Kalbadevi neighbourhood where he was given accommodation in a dairy shop in return for low-grade work. He was eventually ejected by the shopkeeper as he was unable to provide much help at the shop in between his cricket training. Having no place of his own, Jaiswal stayed in a tent with the groundsmen at the Maidan, where he often slept hungry and sold panipuri to make ends meet.

After living in tents for three years, Jaiswal's cricketing talent was spotted in December 2013 by Jwala Singh, who ran a cricket academy in Santacruz. Singh took Jaiswal under his wing and provided him a place to stay, before becoming his legal guardian and obtaining his power of attorney.

Career

Youth career
Jaiswal first came to the limelight in 2015 when he scored 319 not out and took 13/99 in a Giles Shield match, an all-round record in school cricket, which was recognized by Limca Book of Records. He was then selected in Mumbai under-16 squad followed by India under-19s. Jaiswal was the highest run-scorer (318 runs) and player of the tournament at the 2018 were bowled out for 152 and 85, in an innings win. Later that year, he scored 294 runs in 7 matches, including four half-centuries, in the under-19 tri-series in England which also featured Bangladesh.

In December 2019, he was named in India's squad for the 2020 Under-19 Cricket World Cup. He became the leading scorer in the tournament, and scored a century against Pakistan in the semi-final.

Senior career

Jaiswal made his first-class debut for Mumbai in the 2018–19 Ranji Trophy on 7 January 2019. He made his List A debut on 28 September 2019, for Mumbai in the 2019–20 Vijay Hazare Trophy. On 16 October 2019, he scored 203 runs off 154 balls in a Vijay Hazare Trophy match against Jharkhand and became the youngest double centurion in the history of List A cricket at 17 years, 292 days. His knock included 17 fours and 12 sixes against a bowling attack consisting of Varun Aaron and Shahbaz Nadeem. He was one of the top five run-scorers at the 2019–20 Vijay Hazare Trophy, with 564 runs in 6 matches at an average of 112.80. He was named in the India B squad for the 2019–20 Deodhar Trophy.

In the 2020 IPL auction, he was bought by the Rajasthan Royals ahead of the 2020 Indian Premier League (IPL). He made his Twenty20 debut for the Rajasthan Royals in the 2020 IPL on 22 September 2020. He made his maiden half-century against Chennai Super Kings on 2 October 2021

Honours

 Indian Premier League runner up 2022

References

External links
 

2001 births
Living people
Indian cricketers
Mumbai cricketers
People from Bhadohi district
Cricketers from Mumbai
Rajasthan Royals cricketers